Chessington World of Adventures Resort is a theme park, zoo and hotel complex in Chessington, Greater London, England, around  southwest of Central London. The complex opened as Chessington Zoo in 1931, with the theme park being developed alongside the zoo by The Tussauds Group and opening on 7 July 1987, as one of the first themed amusement parks in Britain. The theme park, which features over 40 rides, is now owned by Merlin Entertainments, following its merger with The Tussauds Group in 2007. Under Merlin, Chessington has been increasingly developed into a resort tourist destination, including two on-site hotels, a high ropes course and camp site.

Chessington Zoo has over 1,000 animals, including western lowland gorillas, sea lions, and Sumatran tigers. It is split up into several areas: Trail of the Kings, Sealion Bay, Children's Zoo, Amazu, Penguin Bay and the Wanyama Village and Reserve as well as a Sea Life Centre.

Chessington World Of Adventures is usually the 4th most visited park in the UK with an attendance of 1.69m in 2019 however in 2020 due to the coronavirus pandemic and a shortened operating season along with limited park capacity the park had a huge drop in attendance and became the 3rd most visited park in 2020 behind Thorpe Park.

Chessington World of Adventures theme park consists of themed areas loosely styled on a range of world cultures. Adventure Point is an English market square, Mexicana borrows from the Wild West, Shipwreck Coast a nautical adventure land, Wild Woods a European street with Bavarian architecture, Forbidden Kingdom mirrors Egypt and Arabia, while Land of the Tiger reflects the Far East, and Wild Asia an Indian jungle. Major attractions include: Vampire, Dragon's Fury, KOBRA, Tiger Rock, Scorpion Express, Zufari: Ride into Africa!, The Gruffalo River Ride Adventure and Croc Drop.

History

The mansion at Chessington World of Adventures Resort known today as the Burnt Stub was originally built in 1348, in Chessington, Surrey. In the English Civil War it became a royalist stronghold, and Oliver Cromwell's Parliamentary forces razed it to the ground. The Burnt Stub site was rebuilt as an inn, until the 18th century, when the Vere Barker family rebuilt it in neo-gothic Victorian style.

Founding of zoo
The resort has its roots in Chessington Zoo, which opened in 1931; it was started by Reginald Stuart Goddard, who had bought the estate to showcase his private collection of animals. It was once the largest private zoo in England. After Goddard died in 1946, the Pearson Publishing Company took over the zoo and managed it until 1978, when The Tussauds Group, a subsidiary of the Pearson Group, took control.

Founding of theme park
In 1984, due to the zoo's declining attendance, Tussauds's commissioned John Wardley to come up with plans to revitalize the park. Wardley had a huge influence on the rides being created at both Chessington and its sister parks Thorpe Park and Alton Towers. The decision was made to open a theme park to complement the zoo, and so Chessington World of Adventures was born. On 7 July 1987 Chessington World of Adventures opened to the public in a ceremony including Prince Edward. The park was built on a relatively small budget of around £12 million, to test the still-emerging theme park market.

In its first year, the park opened with the roller coaster Runaway Mine Train, the log flume Dragon River, the monorail Safari Skyway, the dark ride The 5th Dimension, and the Chessington Railroad as the main attractions (all supplied by the German ride manufacturer Heinrich Mack GmbH & Co). Smuggler's Galleon (a swinging ride) reached heights of 20 meters; it was later renamed Black Buccaneer.

The new park development adopted a pay-once price structure as opposed to the fairground's former pay-per-ride format. Other support rides were also opened and the park opened five themed areas: Calamity Canyon, Mystic East, Market Square, Toy Town and Circus World.

The 1990 season expanded Chessington with the opening of the Transylvania area, featuring The Vampire (opening and still operating as the only suspended rollercoaster outside of America) and Prof. Burp's Bubble Works. Both of these major rides had a significant and positive impact on the park's popularity. By this time Smugglers' Galleon and the Smugglers' Cove area had been created.

The 1995 season arrived with Rameses Revenge, the park's first inverting ride. Rameses Revenge was new in the Forbidden Kingdom area; an area which had opened the previous year in conjunction with the Terror Tomb dark ride. Also new for 1995 was Seastorm in Pirates' Cove, and the Carousel, located next to the explorer gate. In 1999, Chessington opened the hardcore thrill ride Samurai in the Mystic East. 1999 also saw the rename of Calamity Canyon into Mexicana, following the opening of Rattlesnake the year before. Beanoland, bringing two new rides to the park: Billy's Whizzer and Rodger the Dodger's Dodgems was built in 2000 on the former site of Circus World  (instead of Colossus which was built at Thorpe Park instead).

Development as resort

On 22 May 2007, The Tussauds Group was taken over by Merlin Entertainments Ltd, which owns other brands such as Sea Life Centres. Besides Chessington, Merlin also purchased Alton Towers, the nearby Thorpe Park, and Madame Tussauds, which made Merlin the second largest entertainment operator in the world in terms of attendance numbers, behind Disney. As Chessington World of Adventures and Thorpe Park are located within 20 miles of each other, Merlin Entertainments has made efforts to market the two parks to different age groups: Thorpe Park caters to teenagers and young adults, while Chessington World of Adventures Resort is for families and people of all ages. In June 2007, the park opened the Safari Hotel next to Chessington Zoo, themed to a safari lodge. 2008 saw the opening of the Chessington Sea Life Centre.

Also in 2010, the Wanyama reserve was opened, giving the Africa-themed Safari hotel guests a view of animals. The Wild Asia area was also added, with its KOBRA ride. In 2011 the Ocean Tunnel and surrounding rooms in the Sea Life Centre were re-themed to Azteca. In 2012 a new land themed to Africa replaced ToyTown.  In 2013, Chessington introduced Zufari: Ride Into Africa, with visitors touring the area in a safari truck. In the same year, the annual Halloween Hocus Pocus event included a new attraction, The Mystery of Hocus Pocus Hall, featuring projection-mapped visual effects.

In 2014, "nearly £15 million" was invested in the resort as the whole, with a new wing built next to the Safari Hotel, advertised as a second standalone hotel, named "Azteca Hotel". The Safari Hotel also received a second pool. Theme park developments for the year included the refurbishment of the Runaway Train roller coaster as Scorpion Express and Amazu Treetop Adventure, a children's raised play area within the zoo. The park's annual Halloween event was rebranded Howl'O'Ween. Over the festive period Chessington launched the new Winter's Tail event, featuring a new seasonal show A Christmas Gift, as well as market stalls and a 60 ft Christmas tree. Attendance rose to 2.05 million guests in 2014, the second highest figure in the park's history, which previously peaked in 1995.

2015 was advertised as "Year of the Penguins", introducing an updated Penguins of Madagascar Live: Operation Cheezy Dibbles show on the Madagascar stage, a rethemed "Jungle Bouncers" as  "Penguins of Madagascar Mission: Treetop Hoppers" (since reverted to Berry Bouncers) and "Penguin Bay", a refurbished enclosure for the Zoo's Humboldt penguins. New Penguins of Madagascar themed suites also opened in the Safari Hotel. 2015 also saw the Chessington Conservation Fund Evening relaunched as "Roar & Explore". The new event features night rides on Zufari: Ride into Africa! as well as child-friendly activities. Chessington's attendance fell in 2015 to 1.65 million. The long-running Safari Skyway monorail closed midway through the year, after 29 years of service.

Little was changed during the 2016 season, a small live show named Pandamonium opened near the zoo, a Go Ape high ropes course opened, and Trail of the Kings received some new decoration. Explorer Glamping was also introduced over the summer months, launching on 27 May. Tomb Blaster was refurbished with all LED UV lighting and new laser gun system.

In 2017, The Gruffalo River Ride Adventure opened, replacing Bubbleworks, as well as the original Carousel being replaced with a newer, themed carousel named "The Chessington Adventure Tree".

In 2018, the ferris wheel Peeking Heights was removed and the Mystic East area rethemed into Land of the Tiger, with three new tiger enclosures, four tigers from Kolmården Wildlife Park, and a new theme for Dragon Falls, with its new name Tiger Rock.

In 2019, they rethemed their old 3D walkthrough attraction, Hocus Pocus Hall, into another one of Julia Donaldson's creations, Room on the Broom - A Magical Journey. Halfway through the season, Chessington announced that their swinging boat ride, Black Buccaneer, would not open for 2019. In October, Chessington announced that Rameses Revenge would close on 3 November.

2020 saw the opening of a new area called The Rainforest. The area included 3 new attractions, the first of which, a kids track ride called Jungle Rangers. The second is a relocated mini log flume from Weymouth Sealife called River Rafts. The third is the pre existing treetop hoppers which retained its name and was refurbished. The Flying Jumbos Ride was also relocated and rethemed into Elmers Flying Jumbos based on the children's book.

2021 saw a new family drop tower 'Croc Drop' open, themed to the Egyptian god Sobek, replacing Rameses Revenge. Blue Barnacle also opened to replace the now defunct Black Buccaneer swinging pirate ship.

2022 saw a retheme and refresh of the Pirates' Cove themed area, to Shipwreck Coast, with the addition of two new rides. These are 'Barrel Bail Out', a Watermania ride and 'Trawler Trouble', a Rockin' Tug relocated from Thorpe Park. Seastorm also reopened following an extensive refurbishment. On top of this there was general park wide refurbishments and touch ups, with some significant work in Wild Asia and Adventure Point as well as a new Explorer Gate entrance, in preparation for World of Jumanji in 2023. Jungle Bus in Wild Asia left the Resort for the 2022 season. It was replaced for 2023. 2022 was a year of 'eventures' with a new carnival event 'Mardi Grrra!' running from 27 May - 26 June.

2023 is set to be a major year for the resort, with the opening of a new land on May 15th, 'The World of Jumanji'. The new area will feature a B&M Shuttle Launched Wing coaster, and two SBF Visa Group attractions. Plans indicate tropical planting and a huge theming piece; the 'Jaguar Shrine' from the films. The park are also building a Safari Lodge village on the Wanyama Reserve for the 2023 season.

Rides and attractions

Roller coasters

Flat rides

Dark rides

Water rides

Other rides

Children's rides

Past attractions
Many of the rides and areas at the park have been either re-themed over the years, while others have moved to other theme parks and been replaced.
 The Fun City Show tent, housing circus/stunt entertainment, was demolished in 1999 to make way for Beanoland to open the next season.

 Beanoland was an area themed around The Beano comic. It opened in 2000 and closed in 2009, featuring Billy's Whizzer, Dennis' Madhouse, Roger the Dodger's Dodgems and Bash Street Bus. The area was rethemed into Wild Asia in 2010 with all rides intact and the addition of KOBRA to the area.
 Runaway Train was a mine train themed powered roller coaster in the Mexicana area. Opened in 1987, and closed at the end of 2012. Re-themed to Scorpion Express.
 Action Man Training HQ (also called Action Man Critical Mission) was a large children's adventure playground-type attraction, opened in 1997 and closed in 2005.
 Magic Carpet was located in the Mystic East area, opening in 1988 and closed at the end of the 1998 season. Samurai (see below) was installed in its place.
 Samurai was a Mondial Top Scan installed in 1999 and closed in 2003 in Mystic East, then relocated to sister park Thorpe Park.
 Chessington Zoo Railway ( miniature gauge) closed in 1985 before the theme park had been constructed.
 Chessington Railroad ( narrow gauge) left at the end of 1996. Although still a popular attraction, the fact that long stretches of the route were on open pathways meant it was considered a safety risk and it was removed.
 Rodeo (originally named The Juggler and located in Circus World between 1989 and 1994) was a Huss breakdance ride that closed at the end of the 2004 season. It remained closed until being removed altogether in 2007. The ride's centrepiece of a cowboy on horseback was repurposed as a prop in Vampire.
 Toytown Roundabout was also removed at the end of 1999. The more traditional carousel, which had been open since 1996 close to the park's north entrance, took its place.
 Clown Coaster, formerly Toy Town Coaster, was a very small children's roller coaster. It was removed to make way for the new Berry Bouncers ride which took its place in 2001.
 Prof. Burp's Bubble Works was a famed water dark ride in the Transylvania area, opened in 1990 and closed in 2005. It took riders on a tour of a highly animated fizzy pop factory, featuring a unique fountain finale ending. The original version was produced by Keith Sparks and John Wardley.
 Imperial Leather Bubbleworks was a dark water ride opened in 2006, succeeding the original Prof. Burp's Bubble Works. It took rides through a 'soap factory', with most its scenes heavily modified from the original attraction and now sponsored by Imperial Leather. The ride closed in September 2016 to make way for The Gruffalo River Ride Adventure.
 The Fifth Dimension was a dark ride that opened in 1987 and closed in 1993, based around the story of a TV repair robot named Zappomatic and his quest to defeat the computer-created monster, the Gorg. Replaced by Terror Tomb.
 Terror Tomb (later renamed Forbidden Tomb) was a dark ride opened in 1994, replacing The Fifth Dimension. It told the story of a tomb robber named Abdab and the various dangers he encountered as he attempted to steal a precious emerald from within the tomb. It was succeeded by Tomb Blaster in 2001. Several of the original sets remain in Tomb Blaster, but with significant alterations.
 Vampire: The Haunting in the Hallows, also known as the Black Forest from 2009 to 2013, was a walk through attraction only open during Halloween. It took place in the graveyard leading to Vampire.
 The Mystery of Hocus Pocus Hall was a walk through attraction only open during Halloween, and took place in what would normally be Hocus Pocus Hall during normal season. It followed the storyline of the park mascot, Sir Arthur Stubbs. The soundtrack of the attraction was played parkwide from 2013, until it was scrapped for 2015. The soundtrack is now used park-wide for the ‘Howl-o-ween’ event.
 Madagascar Live! Prepare to Party was a 20-minute live stage show featuring characters from the Madagascar film franchise. It was located it the Africa area and ran from March 2012 until late 2014. It was replaced by Penguins of Madagascar Live: Operation Cheezy Dibbles in 2015 as part of 'The Year of the Penguins'.
 Safari Skyway was a historic monorail attraction that provided guests a guided overhead tour of Chessington Zoo and the Burnt Stub mansion area. Originally opening before the theme park in 1986, the ride almost lasted thirty years before closing abruptly in July 2015 due to ongoing maintenance issues.
 Carousel was a classic carousel ride located in Market Square. It opened in 1996 and closed in 2016. A new carousel was built for 2017 to serve as a spiritual successor to the original carousel. It was named The Chessington Adventure Tree.
 Penguins of Madagascar Live: Operation Cheezy Dibbles was a live show in Africa. It opened in 2015 as part of Chessington's Year of the Penguins and closed at the end of the 2016 season. It was replaced by The Gruffalo Arena in 2017.
 Peeking Heights was a Ferris wheel originally located at Thorpe Park. It was relocated to make way for Rush and opened at Chessington in 2005 and closed on 10 September 2017 in order to make way for new tiger enclosures as part of the retheme of Mystic East to Land of the Tiger for 2018.
 Hocus Pocus Hall was a walkthrough attraction located in the Burnt Stub Mansion which opened in 2003 but closed in 2018 to be replaced by Room on the Broom: A Magical Journey.
 Toadies Crazy Cars was a kids track ride located within the Africa section of the park. The ride opened as Old Crooks Railroad in 1987 and was rethemed to Toadies Crazy Cars for 2001. The attraction closed in 2019, to make way for The Rainforest. The ride was replaced by the far superior Jungle Rangers, which follows a similar layout.
 Rameses Revenge was a Top Spin ride which opened in June 1995 in the Forbidden Kingdom area. Manufactured by Huss Rides, it was the world's first top spin ride to feature a drown-upside-down element. Chessington announced that it was to be removed in 2019. Before it was removed, it was the only remaining top-spin in the UK. The ride was replaced with a drop tower named Croc Drop. 
 Black Buccaneer was a Swinging ship ride which originally opened as Smugglers Galleon in 1988 in the Smugglers' Cove area. Manufactured by Huss Rides, the ride was rethemed to Black Buccaneer in 1999 alongside the surrounding area to Pirates’ Cove. The ride operated for the final time at the end of 2018 during the Winters Tail event. Chessington later announced on their social media that a new replacement ship was to be installed called Blue Barnacle. This new ship is thought to be entirely new ride hardware rather than the old ship simply rethemed.
 Jungle Bus was a children's Crazy Bus ride made by Italian manufacturer Zamperla. The attraction originally opened in 2001 as the Bash Street Bus in Beanoland, however was rethemed to the Jungle Bus for the new Wild Asia themed area in 2010. Following the ride being unexpectedly cut from the Feb-ROAR-y event ride line-up, it was announced that Jungle Bus had reached the end of its service life, and would be removed from the park in 2022. A new bus replaced the original Jungle Bus towards the end of the 2022 season.

Future developments
In recent years, several investments have taken place in the resort in attempt to recover from the visitor numbers lost from COVID-19.

World of Jumanji
Three new attractions are planned as part of the World of Jumanji, located on the picnic field opposite Dragon's Fury; set to open May 15th 2023.

Safari Lodges
In line with Merlin Entertainments' ambition to invest in short break offerings, there are plans in the development of 34 Safari Lodges in the Wanyama Village.

Waterpark

On the 16 November 2022, Chessington held a public consultation regarding plans to create an indoor water park as an extension to the Safari Hotel. Public consultation closed on the 30 November and plans are yet to be submitted.

Events
As of 2023, Chessington operates eight events; Zootastic Weekends, Zootastic Half Term, Eggsplorers, Mardi Grrra, Wilderfest, Roar & Explore, Howl'o'ween, and Winter's Tail. The first events are Zootastic Weekends (Selected weekends Jan - March) and Zootastic Half Term (13 - 17 Feb). During these events the Chessington Zoo opens with no rides and attractions available until the start of the main theme park season. 

The first event of the theme park season is Eggsplorers. A brand new event for 2023, featuring Easter Animal Trails, an Easter bunny meet and greet, plus all of the theme parks rides and attractions. Next up is Mardi Grrra. Across the Resort you will get to celebrate with fabulous, colourful and flamboyant Kreature Krewes. Each Krewe of party animals are representing some of our most iconic, dazzling and spectacular animals, in a jamboree of dance, music and entertainment. You can also take your tastebuds on an adventure of their own at our culinary carnival, where you’ll find flavours from around the world.

Mardi Gera is followed by Wilderfest, a summer event with music and various show stages. The event is marketed as Britain's WILDEST Music Festival.

On an evening in June, Chessington Zoo opens late for the Chessington Roar & Explore conservation event. The evening involves speeches and information about the charity work the Chessington Conservation Fund is involved in, as well as presentations of some of the Zoo's endangered species. Zufari: Ride into Africa! opens late for the event, and all revenue goes towards the fund.

Winter's Tail is a Christmas event during December weekends and school holidays. Throughout the event the resort opens with Christmas decoration and a Christmas grotto 'village' next to Sea Lion Bay. Parts of the theme park are open, with 2019's event seeing Vampire return to head a similar lineup to 2018. The Gruffalo River Ride Adventure, Seastorm, The Chessington Adventure Tree, Tiny Truckers and Room on the Broom - A Magical Journey all opened alongside the zoo. A festive show named The Gruffalo and Stickman Christmas Groove is performed several times throughout the day as well as the chance to decorate cookies in The Gruffalo Kitchen.

Howl'o'ween
During the last two weeks of the theme park season, Chessington hosts its biggest event - Howl'o'ween, previously known as Halloween Hocus Pocus. During the event the park is decorated for Halloween with spiders, grave stones, voodoo dolls, skeletons and cobwebs as well as large, coloured eyes. Some actors also roam the theme park and zoo dressed as witches, vampires and zombies. During the event, Halloween themed attractions open, rides also operate in the dark.

 – Previous Howl'o'ween attraction.  – Current Howl'o'ween attraction.

 Haunted Howl'O'Ween Live is a live show in the Gruffalo Arena in the Africa Section of the park. New for 2018, the show features singers and dancers in a Halloween musical extravaganza. In 2021 it was replaced by The Wild Witches Live Show, on the Newly named Mane Stage in the Rainforest.
 Creepy Caves Unearthed is advertised as the scariest Halloween attraction offered. New for 2017, Creepy Caves Unearthed won the SCARECON 2017 Award for Best Original Concept and Design and was nominated for Best Set/Costume and Make Up.
 The Room on the Broom Spooky Story Time is a live show based on the children's book written by Julia Donaldson. 
 The Curse of The Lost Tomb is a brand scare maze constructed inside the Adventure Outpost Restaurant in Wild Asia. First opening in 2015, It is based upon the lost tomb of Genghis Khan, with the key theme being whether the secrets of Genghis Khan would be revealed, or whether the tomb would claim all of those who entered. The maze features a mixture of challenges and light scares.
 Trick or Treat Wood - Topsy Turvy was designed for younger adventurers, and they had to choose which path they wanted to take, one for a trick or one for a treat. Along the way enchanted fairies and ghostly goblins would guide them. This was new for 2015.
 Fancy Dress Competition this was new 2015, and was judged daily in Africa.
 Vampire: The Haunting in the Hollows is based on the fictional Transylvanian village of Black Hollow. Guests encounter several characters such as a gravedigger in the first half. Guests then visit the crypt of the forsaken and encounter several vampires, guests then escape through a strobe lit maze. It was due to return for the 2015 season, but was suddenly and unexpectedly pulled from the lineup.
 The Mystery of Hocus Pocus Hall is the signature attraction at Howl'o'ween. It involves guests visiting Stubb Manor, the home of explorer Sir Arthur Stubbs, in an attempt to uncover what caused his sudden disappearance. The attraction includes scenes based on different areas of the park and zoo, such as Wild Asia, Atlantis, Forbidden Kingdom and Pirates' Cove. The entire attraction is based around an emerald, which guests journey through the 'core' of as the finale. 
 The Pumpkin High School of Rock is a new stage show based around an underworld rock competition. It did not return for 2015.
 The Hair and Scary Show is an insect based new live show about two characters - Hairy and Scary. It did not return for 2015.
 The Krypt was a live scaremaze based on the Wild Asia area, launched in 2011, it never returned for Halloween due to a very poor throughput and high running costs.
 Black Forest Haunt was a walkthrough based around a vampire in Transylvania. First opening in 2009, the Black Forest Haunt lasted three years until it was replaced by Vampire: The Haunting in the Hollows in 2012.
 Burt & Bilge's Big Bad Boo was a stage show based in Market Square, it followed Burt and Bilge as they tried to capture the ghost of Market Square - the Big Bad Boo. Lasting two years starting in 2012, and giving its final performance in 2013.
 Hocus Pocus Hall: Bewitched was similar to the year-round attraction Hocus Pocus Hall, with the exception that it featured live actors. The attraction lasted many years and closed at the end of 2012. It was replaced by The Mystery of Hocus Pocus Hall.
 Spook Factor was a stage show held in the Land of the Dragon's theatre during Halloween Hocus Pocus. Replaced by the Hairy and Scary Show.
 The Scooby-Doo event was what the original Halloween Hocus Pocus event was based on, featuring attractions such as The Mystery Machine and a Scooby-Doo meeting point. It was replaced in 2006 by a Star Wars based event.
 The Star Wars event was held during the 2006 Halloween Hocus Pocus event to replace the previous Scooby-Doo based attractions. Due to a poor reception, the event never returned. Instead new attractions were conceived for following events.

One-off events
Ice Age - In August 2009 Chessington held an event to celebrate the release of Ice Age: Dawn of the Dinosaurs. The park opened a temporary maze outside Beanoland for the event.	
Vampire XXI - In April 2011 Chessington opened a temporary maze in the area outside the Vampire roller coaster to celebrate its 21st birthday. The event was free and ran for two weeks.	
Mystic East Carnival - The Mystic East Carnival was a display of arts from the orient shown in Market Square and Mystic East. The event was held in May for a number of weeks.	
25th Birthday Celebration - During July 2012, the resort had 25 days of fun to celebrate the theme park's 25th anniversary.
African Adventures - The February half term event for many years up until 2015, this event saw African tribal dancers and street explorers can be found roaming and interacting with guests, as well as African artwork and creative activities dotted around the park.
Animal Adventures - A weeklong celebration held during the February half term of 2016 to celebrate 85 years of the Zoo being at Chessington. Many animal talks and events went on to celebrate all Animal life at Chessington. This was a one-off event, however, it was adapted for a more general event under the same name from 2017.
Moshi Monsters - From 25 July -18 August 2012, the Moshi Monsters visited Chessington. The characters could be met, and there were challenges around the park which if completed could win Moshi Monster lanyards, in-game 1,000 rox codes and seeds. Each Moshling was looking after a secret symbol, collect all eight to unlock the code word and reveal a new Moshling online. You could also have had the chance to win lots of 'goopendous' Moshi prizes and giveaways.
Elmer's Big Art Parade - From 19 April -31 May 2021, where you could join everyone’s favourite patchwork elephant for: A vibrant sculpture trail around the Resort, rides on Elmer’s Flying Jumbos and meet and greets with Elmer himself!

Theme park

Chessington World of Adventures opened on 6 July 1987. Its main ethos centres around the idea of bringing together a collection of the different cultures and experiences from around the world; a considerable amount of the park is built on the stereotypical setting of each area it is focused on. Major attractions include: Vampire, Dragon's Fury, KOBRA, Zufari: Ride into Africa, Scorpion Express & Croc Drop. Shows include Wild Factor and Pandamonium, which is seasonal only showing in the summer from 2017 onwards.

The theme park comprises ten themed lands, each with a cultural setting. The central area of the park, Adventure Point, resembles an old English market town, whereas Mystic East is themed around the orient, with the water ride Dragon Falls opening there in 1987. Mexicana is inspired by a small town in America's old far-west. Shipwreck Coast is a nautical adventure land. Wild Woods is modeled on a central European high street with Bavaria in Germany and the Transylvania region of Romania as its key influences. Forbidden Kingdom is based on Ancient Egypt with hieroglyphics carved onto its surroundings. Land of the Dragons is the only "fantasy" themed area of the theme park and is a self-contained dragon-themed land with rides mostly for young children.

Among the newer lands is Wild Asia which opened in 2010 as a replacement for Beanoland with an Indian jungle theme. In 2017, the existing Transylvania area was renamed "Wild Woods" in conjunction with the opening of The Gruffalo River Ride Adventure. In 2018, Mystic East was renamed "Land of the Tiger", with the addition of new tiger enclosures and the partial refurbishment of Dragon Falls as Tiger Rock. In 2020, the ZUFARI themed area became known as the Wanyama Village And Reserve.

Timeline of Park Areas

Gallery

Adventure Point
Adventure Point is the central area of the park, it features a selection of shops, restaurants, smaller outlets including hotdog and doughnut units and guest services, as well as the Chessington Adventure Tree carousel, which was added in 2017 The area has mostly Tudor and early Georgian architecture, featuring details such as hanging baskets and boxed plants. Rides include Tiny Truckers and Elmer's Flying Jumbos.  In the centre of Adventure Point is a large compass feature in the ground. The compass points guests in the direction of all the resort locations, it includes: theme park lands, some zoo areas, the Sea Life centre and the hotels. The area was named 'Market Square' until 2017.

Mexicana

Themed as a Mexican- inspired square and a Far West town in the American's Old West, the Mexicana area was named 'Calamity Canyon' until 1999. Rattlesnake, a steel sit-down Wild Mouse roller coaster, opened in 1998. Scorpion Express is a mine train themed roller coaster, previously named the Runaway Train from its opening in 1987. The ride was originally designed with an interacting cave feature and an extensively designed queueline above the surrounding buildings, around a lake and down into an underground mine, since a redesign in 2014 the ride has been changed to be completely in the open with new theming and is renamed 'Scorpion Express'.

Shipwreck Coast
Shipwreck Coast is an area adjacent to Adventure Point, originally themed to a Cornish fishing village. Rides include the Blue Barnacle, a swinging pirate ship and Seastorm, a circular family boat ride that simulates a sea storm. The area was previously known as Pirates' Cove until the 2022 season, when it received a nautical retheme and overhaul, with the addition of two new attractions. These are Barrel Bail Out, a watermania ride and Trawler Trouble, a Rockin' Tug relocated from Thorpe Park.

Land of the Tiger
Until the end of the 2017 season named "Mystic East", this is an oriental-themed area built around the Tiger Rock log flume (previously Dragon River).

In July 2017, Chessington filed for planning permission to partially redesign the area to include new tiger enclosures, including walkways over guests' heads, and a new themed feature for the log flume, to be renamed Tiger Rock. The park's ferris wheel Peeking Heights was demolished to make way for the tiger enclosures. The area closed for redevelopment on 10 September 2017, reopened in 2018. The ride has two drops, one with a rock tunnel, the other going through a tiger rock mouth. The area has been re-decorated and re-designed, with a new entrance by Land of the Dragons and Wild Asia.

Wild Woods

The area, originally named 'Transylvania', was created in 1990, modeled on a mock Barvarian town street, with tall European Architecture. It opened with two major attractions, The Vampire and Prof. Burp's BubbleWorks. Vampire is a steel suspended floorless coaster. The original Arrow Dynamics trains were replaced with Vekoma trains during a closed season in 2001, reopening in 2002. Prof. Burp's BubbleWorks was a dark water ride that took guests through an animated fizzy pop factory. For 2006, it was rethemed to an Imperial Leather toiletries factory. Bubbleworks closed on 6 September 2016 and was replaced by The Gruffalo River Ride Adventure in March 2017.

The area was created as a quaint, 'Central-European' town square to one side, where the entrance to Prof. Burp's BubbleWorks, shops and eateries were located amongst the town buildings, then a path set back from the town leads to the castle entrance of The Vampire. After the park's various changes of management, the area was repeatedly changed in a piecemeal fashion to more of a haunted Halloween style, though most of the fascia remains under various repaints and alterations. Vampire's entrance was moved to an unthemed metal archway in 2001 and the original BubbleWorks entrance recycled as a 'Fastrack' queue in recent years.

In 2017, the park renamed Transylvania to "Wild Woods", in relation to the Gruffalo River Ride Adventure attraction opening that year, though the area itself was largely unchanged.

Forbidden Kingdom

An Ancient Egyptian area, Forbidden Kingdom was created in 1994 originally opening with the Terror Tomb dark ride. Currently, it only contains two rides; Tomb Blaster and Croc Drop. 

Opening in 2002 Tomb Blaster is a dark ride shoot out game where riders shoot laser guns at targets and is a retheme of the 'Terror Tomb' dark ride. One side of Forbidden Kingdom is architecturally designed as an Arabic market town, while Tomb Blaster is set in an Ancient Egyptian courtyard tomb area, though much detail has been removed throughout the area over the years.

The second attraction located in Forbidden Kingdom is a brand new family drop tower Croc Drop. The ride opened as a replacement to Rameses Revenge in March 2021, and is themed around the Egyptian crocodile god Sobek. The ride's slogan is, ‘Brave the drop, release the curse!’

Land of the Dragons
Land of the Dragons is the park's main children's area. Opening in 2004, it is a self-contained, dragon-themed land containing rides and attractions designed to appeal to very young children. It is the only area of the park not themed to a time or place from world culture. There are two play areas in the land: Dragon's Playhouse, a large soft play area, and adjacent to this is Canopy Capers, an outdoor treehouse rope bridge attraction. Griffin's Galleon is a Kontiki rock'n'tug ride and Sea Dragons is a spinning boat ride.

The Dragon's Tale Theater has daily performances of the Wild Factor show and Sir Walter Squirtalot is a fountain that squirts water. Aside from the children's attractions, Dragon's Fury is an intense spinning roller coaster encompassing the area with its layout.

Wild Asia

Wild Asia, opened in early 2010 as a loosely Indian-themed jungle area, with temple ruins and ancient statues the area is a retheme of the old 'Beanoland' area themed to the Beano children's comic books. The attraction Lorikeet Lagoon opened with the area in 2010 as part of Chessington's plan to add zoo enclosures within the theme park, visitors may feed the lorikeets nectar. The area has a number of thrill rides, including KOBRA, a Zamperla flat ride that opened in 2010, Monkey Swinger a wave swinger with a water element that opened in 2000, Tuk Tuk Turmoil bumper cars, which are themed as Asian rickshaw tuk tuks. The last attraction in the area is Temple of Mayhem, an indoor play area where children can fire foam balls, with a minimum age limit of 4 years. The area did feature a small Zamperla magic carpet ride themed around tours of the jungle called Jungle Bus, which was replaced with a like-for-like ride system in 2022.

The Rainforest 
The Rainforest is a small area aimed at families. Its architecture is recycled from the previous "Toytown" theme, with the original caricatured buildings redressed as African huts. Its previous name "Africa" has been home of the Madagascar franchise since opening in 2012. In 2020 it was refurbished as The Rainforest with a new mini log flume, River Rafts, relocated from Weymouth Sea Life Centre.

Wanyama Village & Reserve
Wanyama Village & Reserve is Chessington's African area in the form of a large animal reserve. It has ZUFARI - Ride into Africa! as the key attraction, a safari truck adventure through an undiscovered area of Africa. Making up part of the ZUFARI landscape is the Wanayama Village and Reserve, an African themed area of the zoo. The ZUFARI field and Wanyama Reserve are used as a backdrop to the Safari Hotel. ZUFARI's total size is 22 acres and has flamingos, giraffe, ostrich, Nile lechwe, white rhino, Grevy's zebra, scimitar horned oryx and sitatungas. Along the pathways of Zufari are various African-style paintings on fences. In the centre of the Wanyama section of ZUFARI is a large faux-stone carving of a lion. A winding waterfall runs along its side. The area's name was changed in 2020 from ZUFARI to Wanyama Village & Reserve.

World Of Jumanji
Chessington's newest themed area,  'The World of Jumanji' will open on May 15th 2023, becoming Chessington's 11th themed area. The new area will feature a B&M Shuttle Launched Wing coaster, "Mandrill Mayhem" and two SBF Visa Group attractions, "Mamba Strike" and "Ostrich Stampede". As well as three rides, the area will feature extensive theming, immersive 'carnival style' games, themed food and retail experiences, and finally play equipment and a treasure hunt around the area.

The operating season
The operating season usually starts around 20 March all the way to the start of November. Chessington usually opens around Christmas holidays and the February half terms for certain events, which include opening up some selective rides for those events.

Zoo
In 1931, Reginald Goddard opened the Chessington Zoo. In 1946 when Goddard died, the Pearson Publishing Company took over the zoo and managed it until 1978, when The Tussauds Group took control of the park. A number of animals were moved to other zoos during the construction of the theme park. In 1990 the polar bears left the park, as did the hippos and elephants in 1993. In 1994 the snow leopards were relocated to the lion and tiger area. For a time the attraction was called Animal Land, before returning to Chessington Zoo in 2007.

The zoo is generally open simultaneously with the theme park, but also remains open over the winter when the theme park is closed. Zoo entrance is included with the standard ticket price.

As of 2015 the zoo has over 1,000 animals, many of which are endangered and some being extinct in the wild. Chessington Zoo is split up into different areas and walkthroughs. The rhea, mara, wallabies, meerkats and agouti were previously the Monkey Walk area. Monkey Walk was replaced by Creatures Features which in turn was later replaced by the Wanyama Village in 2010. There is also a Children's Zoo, where children may feed domestic farm animals.

The Safari Skyway, an elevated monorail with an entrance in the Market Square theme park area, takes riders around various animal enclosures at the zoo. The ride closed in 2015 due to cost of continued maintenance. An animal presentation in front of the Burnt Stub Mansion hosts the Animal Antics show at different times throughout the day. Near the entrance to the Zoo, there are enclosures for otters and reindeer. Chessington Zoo also has an area called Sealion Bay, which features sea lion presentations several times a day and Creepy Caves, a reptile house.

The Trails of the Kings; a walkthrough attraction home to enclosures for nine western lowland gorillas, two Sumatran tigers, two Asiatic lion, fossa, Carpathian lynx, and binturong. In 2007 the Trail of the Kings section of the zoo underwent an inspection with the outcome that the gorilla enclosure was too small. A bigger building for the gorillas was completed in 2010. As of 2013, there are 10 gorillas at Chessington, as well as two infants born in 2012.

The Wanyama Village & Reserve opened in late May 2010, in an area behind the Safari Hotel and houses animals such as Grévy's zebra, sitatunga antelope, ostrich, dorcas gazelle, Nile lechwe, fennec fox, dwarf mongoose, southern ground hornbill, Kirk's dik-dik, Aloatran gentle lemur, black-cheeked lovebird, crested porcupine, meerkats, scimitar horned oryx, common eland and Ankole cattle. It is part of the ZUFARI animal reserve. The area is open to guests staying in the Safari Hotel during the evening.

The AMAZU Treetop Adventure opened in April 2014 on the former site of the Monkey & Bird Garden. The area features adventure trail walkways, play areas and Aztec theming. The area has spider monkeys, saki monkeys, red-handed tamarins, golden-headed lion tamarins, Bolivian squirrel monkeys, Geoffroy marmosets, capybara, military macaws, Ecuadorian red-lored amazons, giant wood rail, agouti and three-banded armadillo. The animals in the area can either be viewed on ground or through the Amazu raised walkways, some of which, go through the enclosures.

Penguin Bay is a new area that opened in March 2015 as part of the Year of the Penguins. It features the long time residents of Chessington Zoo Humboldt penguins in a beach themed area. Seating for the demonstrations is aboard a shipwreck with a canopy. The new enclosure features glass walls to allow for better public viewing.

In 2016, the Pandamonium live show was opened which features life-size and lifelike animatronic pandas.

Chessington Sea Life Centre
In 2008, Chessington Zoo opened Chessington Sea Life Centre on the site of the old children's Zoo, as an attempt to both determine if the park had a positive future and also to attract more multi-day visits. The Sea Life Centre, which is part of a franchise operated by Merlin Entertainments, has a number of exhibits including a Ray Pool and a Touch Pool. The Sea Life Centre is split into four areas: Our Shoreline, The Reef, Amazonia and Azteca which features the signature Ocean Tunnel.

"Our Shoreline" is the oldest area and has sea creatures found on the coast of Britain, featuring rays, seahorses and starfish. The area also has smaller exhibits including clownfish and crabs. The Touch Pool is also found here, in the centre of the area. The following area is named "The Reef", which features clownfish, cleaner shrimp, regal tang, slipper lobster and upside-down jellyfish

Next to this area is Amazonia, which opened in 2009. It is a slightly smaller version of the same exhibit that has appeared at other Sea Life Centres. It includes red-bellied piranhas, common octopus, tetras and other, smaller exhibits.

Azteca opened in 2011, it features a 10-meter Ocean Tunnel, which has sea creatures including: bonnethead sharks, lion fish, starry pufferfish, surgeon fish, angle fish, catshark and epaulette shark. The tunnel existed before the 2011 addition, but was redeveloped for the arrival of new fish. Aside from the Ocean Tunnel, Azteca also has jellyfish, seahorse and northern wolffish. The placement of the area, has resulted in the division of the Our Shoreline area, which is now separated into two areas.

Accommodation
Currently, Chessington World of Adventures operate two on-site hotels and a Glamping experience.

Safari Hotel

The Safari Hotel is a four star hotel themed to appear like a Safari Lodge. It was originally named the Safari Lodge Hotel in 2007, before changing to the Chessington Resort Hotel in 2010. The hotel was then refurbished and relaunched for 2014 and has since been known simply as the Safari Hotel.

The hotel opened in June 2007 and was originally operated by Holiday Inn until it was fully taken over by Merlin Entertainments in May 2014. The hotel features various African elements with giraffe sculptures in the foyer and Zafari Bar & Grill. The hotel's check in area features a reptile enclose, which has a variety of animals housed in it depending on the time of year.

When the hotel was integrated as a resort in 2010, the Wanyama Village & Reserve opened with access from the hotel.

Azteca Hotel

The Azteca Hotel is the newer of the two and opened in 2014. The hotel is four star and themed around an ancient aztec temple. The hotel has three floors, with each floor themed to a different level of the temple. The top floor (named "Temple Summit") is decorated to give the impression that guests are on top of the structure looking out at the wildlife around.

The hotel's Temple Restaurant has a heavy emphasis on special effects, with a large tower sitting in the centre of the room. Every thirty minutes, it makes a display of water fountains, it also features rapid lighting sequences and ultraviolet markings. Around the perimeter of the restaurant is a trail of leaf cutter ants which pass the tables. At the entrance to the restaurant is a tank of red bellied piranha. Due to the hotel being built partly into the side of a hill, the Temple Restaurant has no windows, and instead has a series of screens built into the walls, showing various animated videos of the South American wildlife.

The hotel is linked to the Amazu area of Chessington Zoo, which is also aztec themed. Due to the location of the hotel in relation to the car parks, check in is located in the Safari Hotel.

Explorer Glamping
Launched on 27 May 2016, Chessington's Explorer Glamping site comprises a total of 31 standard, and four deluxe tents. The Glamping site is located in the south west of the park, behind Lorikeet Lagoon in the Theme Park. The 'Explorer's Outpost' restaurant is available to residents.

Future developments
A management conference held at Chessington by operator Merlin Entertainments in October 2014, outlined a plan to expand the current accommodation offering with a 'Safari Camp', and a development known as the 'Chessington Lodges'. Merlin aim to add a further 200 rooms to the resort, either through lodges or a third hotel. The lodges plan was updated in 2021 and accepted.

In May 2016, a long-term development plan draft was displayed for public feedback. The plans highlighted the installation of a new roller coaster, possibly two; a major attraction in 'Africa' as well as a feature close by the Burnt Stub Mansion. Safari Lodges are proposed behind 'Zufari'. Tiny Truckers, the Carousel, Peeking Heights and Toadie's Crazy Cars are expected to be removed to make way for these developments.

In April 2021, Chessington World Of Adventures revealed they will be hosting a number of face-to-face presentations and Q&As, in line with COVID-19 social distancing guidelines, in the Safari Hotel Serengeti Conference Suite on Monday 17 May 2021 and two virtual events on Tuesday 18 May 2021, as part of public consultations for their new rollercoaster - the first in 17 years, since Dragon's Fury in 2004.

2014 court case
In June 2012, a four-year-old girl fell 4.2 metres (nearly 14 feet) while in line waiting for a ride. The park was summoned by Health and Safety Executive which claimed a health and safety breach. In the same month, park owner Merlin Entertainments initiated a court case to seek an injunction against Peter Cave, owner of survey consultancy Peer Egerton Limited. The consultancy firm had been hired by Merlin to prepare a report on the safety of the park, after the 2012 accident. Cave's firm found 2,000 defects and potential safety hazards. This led to a dispute between Cave and Merlin, culminating in court proceedings to prevent the park from reopening after its 2012 winter break. Merlin won this case and the park reopened.

Cave then set up a campaign to warn the public and staff of the findings, including sending out 80,000 emails. Merlin claimed to have spent the £4.6 million on repairs and improvements that Cave had recommended and named the allegations "baseless". But High Court Judge Elisabeth Laing ruled that the campaign was a "matter of public interest" and refused the injunction to silence Cave.

Green belt restrictions
Due to the majority of the theme park being located on green belt lands the park is subject to several restrictions. Most significant are restrictions in height (no building higher than the tree line), noise (with time restrictions) and traffic management.

Various rides have had to have been built in pits due to these restrictions. It is most noticeable on Blue Barnacle, Croc Drop and Rattlesnake. The resort cannot operate Vampire past 11pm. The resort was not allowed to build anything higher than the Peeking Heights Ferris Wheel, which has since been removed from the park.

Gallery
Main gallery: Chessington World of Adventures Resort at WikiCommons

Theme park and features

Chessington Zoo

See also
 List of theme parks in the United Kingdom
 List of amusement parks

References

External links

 

 
1987 establishments in England
Organizations established in 1987
Merlin Entertainments Group
Amusement parks in England
Parks and open spaces in the Royal Borough of Kingston upon Thames
Buildings and structures in the Royal Borough of Kingston upon Thames
Tourist attractions in the Royal Borough of Kingston upon Thames